Kyoko Nagatsuka and Ai Sugiyama were the defending champions but only Nagatsuka competed that year with Yayuk Basuki.

Basuki and Nagatsuka won in the final 7–6, 6–3 against Kerry-Anne Guse and Sung-Hee Park.

Seeds
Champion seeds are indicated in bold text while text in italics indicates the round in which those seeds were eliminated.

 Els Callens /  Julie Halard-Decugis (quarterfinals)
 Yayuk Basuki /  Kyoko Nagatsuka (champions)
 Laurence Courtois /  Nancy Feber (semifinals)
 Maria Lindström /  Maria Strandlund (semifinals)

Draw

External links
 1996 Schweppes Tasmanian International Doubles Draw

Hobart International – Doubles
Doubles